Hilda Hölzl (2 January 1927 - 10 November 1992) was a Slovenian dramatic soprano.

She was born at Belgrade and made her debut in Zagreb in 1957, singing the role of Leonora in Giuseppe Verdi's Il trovatore.

She died in Ljubljana in November 1992.

1927 births
1992 deaths
Singers from Belgrade
Slovenian operatic sopranos
Yugoslav women opera singers